Rachid Natouri (26 February 1946 – 13 May 2017) was an Algerian professional footballer who played as a right winger.

Honours
Troyes
 Ligue 2 runner-up: 1973

References

1946 births
2017 deaths
Kabyle people
Footballers from Béjaïa
Association football wingers
Algerian footballers
Algerian expatriate footballers
Algeria international footballers
JSM Béjaïa players
Angoulême Charente FC players
Marignane Gignac Côte Bleue FC players
US Boulogne players
AC Ajaccio players
FC Metz players
ES Troyes AC players
Pays d'Aix FC players
Blois Football 41 players
Ligue 1 players
Ligue 2 players
Expatriate footballers in France
Algerian expatriate sportspeople in France
21st-century Algerian people